On July 29, 1999, a shooting spree occurred at two Atlanta-area day trading firms, Momentum Securities and the All-Tech Investment Group. Nine people were killed, and 13 other people were injured. The gunman, identified as 44-year-old former day trader Mark Orrin Barton, later committed suicide in Acworth before he could be apprehended by police.

Police searching Barton's home in nearby Stockbridge found the bodies of his second wife and the two children from his first marriage, murdered by hammer blows inflicted before the shooting spree started. According to a note left at the scene by Barton, his wife was killed on July 27 before the children were on the following day. Barton was believed to be motivated by large financial losses incurred during the previous two months.

Events
On July 27, 1999, Mark Orrin Barton woke up early in the morning at his home in Stockbridge, Georgia, and bludgeoned his second wife, Leigh Ann Vandiver, to death as she slept. The next night, he also beat his children from his first marriage, Matthew and Mychelle, to death. He covered them with blankets and left notes on their bodies, reading in part:
I killed Leigh Ann because she was one of the main reasons for my demise. ... I know that Jehovah will take care of all of them in the next life. I'm sure the details don't matter. There is no excuse, no good reason I am sure no one will understand. If they could I wouldn't want them to. I just write these things to say why. Please know that I love Leigh Ann, Matthew and Mychelle with all my heart. If Jehovah's willing I would like to see them all again in the resurrection to have a second chance. I don't plan to live very much longer, just long enough to kill as many of the people that greedily sought my destruction.

On July 29, Barton went to the offices of his former employer, Momentum Securities, in Atlanta. Witnesses say that Barton briefly chatted with coworkers before suddenly pulling out two pistols and opening fire. He shot and killed four people and attempted to execute Brad Schoemehl, who was shot three times at point-blank range. Barton then walked to the nearby All-Tech Investment Group building and murdered an additional five victims. Barton left the scene before police could arrive. The police searched his house and found the bodies of his family and the notes that he had left with them, in which Barton vehemently denied responsibility for the deaths of his first wife and mother-in-law.

An intense manhunt ensued. Four hours after the All-Tech Investment Group shooting, Barton accosted and threatened a young girl in Kennesaw, apparently attempting to secure a hostage for his escape. The young girl escaped and called police. Responding police officers spotted Barton in his minivan and a chase ensued, culminating at a gas station in Acworth. As law enforcement attempted to apprehend him, Barton shot and killed himself.

Perpetrator

Mark Orrin Barton (April 2, 1955 – July 29, 1999) was born in Stockbridge, Georgia, to an Air Force family and was raised in South Carolina. He attended Clemson University and the University of South Carolina, where he earned a degree in chemistry despite an ongoing drug habit. Back in Atlanta, Barton married Debra Spivey, with whom he had two children named Matthew and Mychelle.

Barton's family moved to Alabama as his employer required him there. Barton grew paranoid and started distrusting his wife. He lost his employment after his performance plummeted. He was also caught sabotaging data of the company that had fired him and served a short jail term for this retaliatory act. Barton found a new employer in Georgia and a mistress in one of his wife's acquaintances, with whom he had an affair. In 1993, Spivey and her mother Eloise were killed by bludgeoning. Barton was the prime suspect in the double homicide, but he was not charged due to a lack of evidence. He always denied having had any part in them, including in the note that he would leave behind with the bodies of Leigh Ann Vandiver and his children in 1999. Despite his denials, authorities still consider Barton a suspect in the 1993 murders.

Barton had received a $294,000 insurance settlement from his first wife's death and used the funds to finance his day trading career, preferring high risk Internet-related stocks. He married Vandiver, his former mistress, in 1995. His mental health continued to deteriorate, however, and he began to suffer from both severe depression and paranoid delusions. In the month prior to his killing spree, Barton had lost $105,000, and Momentum Securities had cancelled his account.

Victims
The following is a list of those killed:
 Leigh Ann Vandiver Barton, 27, wife of Mark Barton
 Matthew David Barton, 11, son of Mark Barton
 Mychelle Elizabeth Barton, 8, daughter of Mark Barton
 Allen Charles Tenenbaum, 48, day trader at All-Tech Investment Group
 Dean Delawalla, 52, day trader at All-Tech Investment Group
 Joseph J. Dessert, 60, day trader at All-Tech Investment Group
 Jamshid Havash, 45, day trader at All-Tech Investment Group
 Vadewattee Muralidhara, 44, a computer course student at All-Tech Investment Group
 Edward Quinn, 58, day trader at Momentum Securities
 Kevin Dial, 38, office manager at Momentum Securities
 Russell J. Brown, 42, day trader at Momentum Securities
 Scott A. Webb, 30, day trader at Momentum Securities

Aftermath
On July 29, 2009, Atlanta marked the 10th anniversary of the tragedy.

References

Further reading
 BBC News stories on the Atlanta shootings
 Manhunt under way for suspect in Atlanta shootings, CNN (July 29, 1999)
 Investigators search for answers after 12 die in Georgia killings, CNN (July 30, 1999)
 Blood bath followed suspect's mounting stock losses, CNN (July 31, 1999)
 Mourners remember gunman's wife as soccer mom, Scout leader, CNN (August 1, 1999)
 A Portrait of the Killer, Time Magazine (August 9, 1999)
 Riding the Mo in the Lime Green Glow, New York Times (November 21, 1999)

External links
 CourtTV's Crime Library feature

1999 in Georgia (U.S. state)
1999 mass shootings in the United States
1999 murders in the United States
Attacks in the United States in 1999
Crimes in Georgia (U.S. state)
Deaths by firearm in Georgia (U.S. state)
Familicides
History of Atlanta
Mass murder in 1999
Mass shootings in Georgia (U.S. state)
Mass shootings in the United States
Murder–suicides in Georgia (U.S. state)
Suicides by firearm in Georgia (U.S. state)